Further Information is a 2000 role-playing game supplement for Continuum published by Aetherco/Dreamcatcher.

Contents
Further Information is a supplement in which information for both historic and fictional eras is presented for the gamemaster.

Reception
Further Information was reviewed in the online second version of Pyramid which said "Some individuals are selected to become spanners, time travelers who strive to protect the timeline from the Narcissists. The Narcissists are an opposing breed of travelers who lack a spanner's cautious nature and who don't care that their oft-paradoxical actions may fragment history. Since the timestream is rife with spanners and Narcissists, there's a whole secret history that, until now, has been drawn with somewhat indistinct lines. Further Information throws things into sharp relief."

Reviews
Backstab #24

References

Role-playing game books
Role-playing game supplements introduced in 2000